The 1860 United States presidential election in Georgia took place on November 6, 1860, as part of the 1860 United States presidential election. Georgia voters chose 10 representatives, or electors, to the Electoral College, who voted for president and vice president.

Georgia was won by the 14th Vice President of the United States John Breckenridge (SD–Kentucky), running with Senator Joseph Lane, with 48.89% of the popular vote, against Senator John Bell (CU–Tennessee), running with the Governor of Massachusetts Edward Everett, with 40.26% of the popular vote and Senator Stephen A. Douglas (D–Illinois), running with 41st Governor of Georgia Herschel V. Johnson, with 10.85% of the popular vote.

Republican Party candidate Abraham Lincoln was not on the ballot in the state. This was the last time until 1964 that Georgia did not vote for the national Democratic Party.

Results

Results by county

References

Georgia
1860
1860 Georgia (U.S. state) elections